Jaqueline Maria Lopes Lima (born 23 April 2001) is a Brazilian badminton player from Joca Claudino Esportes badminton club. She joined the Brazil national badminton team in 2016, and in 2017 she competed in the mixed team event at the 2017 Pan Am Badminton Championships where the team won silver medal. She won her first senior international title at the 2017 Brazil International Challenge tournament partnered with Sâmia Lima. Lima participated at the 2018 Summer Youth Olympics, and was part of the team Theta won the bronze medal in the mixed team event. At the 2019 Lima Pan American Games, she won two bronze medals in the women's and mixed doubles events.

Achievements

Pan American Games 
Women's doubles

Mixed doubles

Pan Am Championships 
Women's doubles

Mixed doubles

Pan Am Junior Championships 
Girls' doubles

BWF International Challenge/Series (19 titles, 9 runners-up) 
Women's singles

Women's doubles

Mixed doubles

  BWF International Challenge tournament
  BWF International Series tournament
  BWF Future Series tournament

References

External links 

 
 Confederação Brasileira de Badminton Atleta

2001 births
Living people
People from Teresina
Brazilian female badminton players
Badminton players at the 2018 Summer Youth Olympics
Badminton players at the 2019 Pan American Games
Pan American Games bronze medalists for Brazil
Pan American Games medalists in badminton
Medalists at the 2019 Pan American Games
Sportspeople from Piauí